New Netherland Company was a chartered company of Dutch merchants. 

Following Henry Hudson’s exploration of the east coast of North America on behalf of the Dutch East India Company in 1609, several Dutch merchants sent ships to trade with the Native Americans (mainly fur) and to search for the Northwest Passage. In order to maximize their profits these merchants decided to form the New Netherland Company and on October 11, 1614 they successfully petitioned the Estates-General for a charter of trading privileges. The charter granted a monopoly of trade between the 40th and 45th parallel for a period of three years, starting on January 1, 1615. In 1618 the Company's charter wasn't renewed because negotiations for the formation of the Dutch West India Company were well advanced. After 1618 New Netherland was open to all traders, but the majority of trade was still conducted by the founders of the New Netherland Company until the establishment of the Dutch West India Company in 1621.

Founders
 

Jonas Witsen (Amsterdam)
Simon Morissen (Amsterdam)
Hans Hongers (Amsterdam)
Paulus Pelgrom (Amsterdam)
Lambrecht van Tweenhuyzen (Amsterdam)
Arnolt van Lybergen (Amsterdam)
Wessel Schenck (Amsterdam)
Hans Claessen (Amsterdam)
Berent Sweertssen (Amsterdam)
Peter Clementsen Brouwer (Hoorn)
John Clementsen Kies (Hoorn)
Cornelis Volckertsen (Hoorn)

See also
 Fort Nassau
 European chartered companies founded around the 17th century (in French)

References

+
Chartered companies
Fur trade
1615 establishments in the Dutch Republic
Companies established in 1615
1618 disestablishments in the Dutch Republic
Companies of the Dutch Republic